Max J. Kelch is a former Associate Justice of the Nebraska Supreme Court.

Biography

Kelch received his Bachelor of Science from the University of Nebraska–Lincoln in 1979 and his Juris Doctor from the University of Nebraska College of Law in 1981.

Kelch began his legal career in 1982. He has worked as a deputy attorney in Nemaha County, Syracuse City, and Nebraska City, a special prosecutor in Johnson County, an Otoe County attorney, and a private practice lawyer.

State court service

Kelch served as a Judge of the County Court, 2nd Judicial District from 2005 to 2007 and as a Judge of the District Court, 2nd Judicial District from 2007 to 2016.

Nebraska Supreme Court service

On February 3, 2016 Governor Pete Ricketts announced his appointment of Kelch to the Supreme Court because of the retirement of Michael McCormack. He was sworn in on March 11, 2016. Kelch resigned on January 23, 2018 effective immediately due a proposed ethics investigation.

References

External links

Living people
Nebraska state court judges
Justices of the Nebraska Supreme Court
University of Nebraska–Lincoln alumni
20th-century American lawyers
21st-century American judges
Year of birth missing (living people)